Inveraray Castle (pronounced   or  ; Scottish Gaelic Caisteal Inbhir Aora ) is a country house near Inveraray in the county of Argyll, in western Scotland, on the shore of Loch Fyne, Scotland's longest sea loch. It is one of the earliest examples of Gothic Revival architecture.

It has been the seat of the Dukes of Argyll, chiefs of Clan Campbell, since the 18th century.

History and architecture 
James V stayed at the old castle of Inveraray in September 1533. A new lute was bought for him in Glasgow and carried to Inveraray by his servant Troilus.

The present castle was built in the Gothic Revival style. Improvements on the estate were begun in 1743 by  Archibald Campbell, Earl of Ilay, soon to become 3rd Duke of Argyll. The foundation stone of the new castle was laid in October 1746, and it replaced an earlier 15th-century castle.

It is one of the earliest Gothic Revival buildings, together with Strawberry Hill House. Originally, all the roofs were flat and crenellated. Later, a third floor with pitched roof and dormer windows was added on all four wings, and steep conical roofs were added to the four round towers. In the 1770s, the village of Inveraray was demolished and rebuilt a short distance away, to give the castle a more secluded setting.

Designers who worked on the new castle include William Adam and Roger Morris. The interior has a number of neoclassical rooms created later in the 18th century for the 5th Duke by Robert Mylne. These are among the rooms open to the public. James Lees-Milne was not impressed by the house when he visited it in 1943, noting the "ugly" grey stone and calling it "grim and forbidding".

In 1975 a devastating fire struck Inveraray and for some time the 12th Duke and his family lived in the castle's basement, while restorations were carried out, funded by a worldwide fundraising drive.

Modern era 
The castle is open to visitors. Its collection includes more than 1,300 pikes, muskets, swords and other weapons.

The 13th Duke and his family live in private apartments occupying two floors and set between two of the four crenellated circular towers. Recent renovations included the installation of the house's first central heating system, powered by burning wood-chips from the family's forestry holdings. It was previously heated only by open fires.

Inveraray Castle is a Category A listed building. Besides welcoming visitors to the castle, the estate's activities include commercial forestry, tenanted farming, wind and hydro power, and deer stalking.

In popular culture 
The 2012 Christmas episode of Downton Abbey was partly filmed here, the castle portraying the fictional "Duneagle Castle". Inveraray Castle also featured in Great Estates Scotland made by American broadcaster PBS in 2014. In 2020, Susan Calman's Secret Scotland filmed at Inveraray Castle.

The "Best of the West" festival, organised by the Duchess, was held at the castle each September until 2018.

The castle was featured on an episode of An American Aristocrat's Guide to Great Estates on the Smithsonian Channel and Amazon Prime Video. It first aired in 2020.

The castle was used as an exterior filming location in the BBC miniseries A Very British Scandal.

Gallery

References

External links 

 Its page in the Gazetteer for Scotland

Castles in Argyll and Bute
Category A listed buildings in Argyll and Bute

Clan Campbell seats
Country houses in Argyll and Bute
Mock castles in Scotland
Gardens in Argyll and Bute
Historic house museums in Argyll and Bute
Inventory of Gardens and Designed Landscapes
Listed castles in Scotland